Broadfield House, a Grade II listed building, was home to a glass museum and hot glass studio, owned and operated by Dudley Council museum service and was located in Kingswinford, West Midlands, England. The museum closed on 30 September 2015.

It displayed a huge variety of glass objects, dating from the 17th century to the present day, across nine galleries. In addition to the glass displays were several paintings that demonstrate glass making and the local landscape. The museum also displayed glass making tools and ephemera produced by the glass industry. Various events and temporary exhibitions were held throughout its history. To complete the visitor experience it had a shop that sold various souvenirs, books, vintage glassware and products from contemporary glassmakers.

The collection is now displayed at Stourbridge Glass Museum.

History of the building
The building has hosted many contrasting occupants. The original structure was a modest two-storey farmhouse built in the mid or late 18th century and faced Barnett Lane. The threshing barn (now the Hot Glass Studio) dates from the same period and serves as a reminder that two hundred years ago this area was open country and farmland. In the early 1800s the house was transformed into a much grander residence when a fine three-storey Regency block with sash windows and portico was built onto the back of the original building. This then formed the main entrance, reversing the orientation of the original house.

In 1943 the house, along with 16 acres, was purchased by Kenneth George MacMaster, an engineering contactor and property developer. The following year MacMaster sold the house to Dennis Smith from Tividale. Smith was the last private owner of Broadfield House and lived here with his family until 1949. In 1949 the house was acquired by Staffordshire County Council for use as a Mothercraft Hostel.

Following local government reorganisation in 1966 ownership was transferred to the enlarged County Borough of Dudley. In 1969 Broadfield House became an Old People’s Home. It was not a suitable site, as illustrated by the 44 stairs and no lift. Following the creation of Dudley MBC in 1974, the Council closed the home and began looking at alternative uses for the building. Inevitably the Mothercraft Hostel and Old People's Home left their mark on the building and features remain that are suggestive of an institutional use.

In 1976 the idea emerged of using the building as a new home for the Council’s Brierley Hill and Stourbridge Glass Collections. This met with considerable opposition as the people of Brierley Hill and Stourbridge were very protective of their collections and did not want them moved from their respective towns. At the final Council meeting, the decision to go ahead won by only one vote! Conversion work began in 1979 and Broadfield House Glass Museum was officially opened by Princess Michael of Kent on 2 April 1980.

The museum closed on 30 September 2015. The collection is now displayed at Stourbridge Glass Museum, which opened on 9 April 2022.

Exhibitions
The museum held various temporary exhibitions, with local, national and international artists represented, featuring historical and contemporary glassworks.

The Studio

The Hot Glass Studio is sponsored by The Hulbert Group of Dudley and has been made available for use by graduates and established glass-blowers.

Archives and Library
The museum housed archives from various sources, containing such items as pattern books, catalogues, description books and invoices. In addition, there is a large collection of images and recorded material providing insight into the people and the manufacturing process. It also housed an extensive reference library of books and information on glassworking, including the entire library of Robert Charleston, former head of glass and ceramics at the Victoria & Albert Museum. The Charleston library includes approximately 700 books as well as his own collection of papers, articles and archival material.
Both the library and archive will continue to be in the care of DMBC Museum Service.

References

External links 
 
 The Friends of Broadfield House Glass Museum
 @Glass_museum on Twitter
 BHGM Flickr album

Grade II listed buildings in the West Midlands (county)
Glass museums and galleries
Museums in the West Midlands (county)
Buildings and structures in the Metropolitan Borough of Dudley
Art museums and galleries in the West Midlands (county)
Decorative arts museums in England
Museums established in 1980